Fronteira is a municipality in Portalegre District in Portugal. The population in 2011 was 3,410, in an area of 248.60 km2.

The present Mayor is Rogério David Sádio da Silva, elected by the Social Democratic Party. The municipal holiday is April 6.

Parishes
Administratively, the municipality is divided into 3 civil parishes (freguesias):
 Cabeço de Vide
 Fronteira
 São Saturnino

Notable people 
 Manuel Cardoso (1566–1650) a Portuguese composer and organist.
 Bartolomeo Riberi (1640–1702) a Roman Catholic prelate, Bishop of Nicotera, 1691–1702

References

Populated places in Portalegre District
Municipalities of Portalegre District
People from Fronteira, Portugal